Akana is an Enterprise API Management and Cloud Integration provider. Akana may also refer to:
 Akana (surname)
 A'ana, a district in Samoa also known as Akana
 Akana, Cameroon, a village in north Cameroon
 Akana, Congo, a village in Republic of the Congo
 Akana, Cuvette-Ouest, a village in Cuvette-Ouest, Congo (Brazzaville)
 Akana, Plateaux, a village in Plateaux, Congo (Brazzaville)
 Akana, Gabon, a town in Ogooué-Ivindo, Gabon
 Akan people of Gabon, known as the Akana
 Akana, Japan, a town subdivision in Shimane Prefecture, Honshū, Japan
 Akana River, a river on southern Honshū island, Japan
 Akana, Russia (Акана), a town in the Sakha (Yakutiya) Republic, Siberia, Russia

See also
 Akan (disambiguation), a disambiguation page